Anubhoothi is a 1997 Indian Malayalam film, directed by I. V. Sasi. The film stars  Suresh Gopi, Khushbu, Jagadish, Vani Viswanath, M. R. Gopakumar and Kaveri in the lead roles. The film has musical score by Shyam.

Cast
Suresh Gopi as Shivankutty
Khushbu as Uthara Thamburatti
Jagadish as Appukuttan Nair
Vani Viswanath as Radha Thamburatti
M. R. Gopakumar as Valyamama
Kaveri as Girija
N. F. Varghese as Shankan Nair
Suresh Nair as Tommy
Jagathy Sreekumar as Diary Pappachi
Rajan P. Dev as Kunjavarchan
Mamukoya
Mala Aravindan as Thankappan
Priyanka as Adivaram Omana
Maniyanpilla Raju as Constable Ambujakshan
Tony
Bheeman Raghu
Sukumari
Kalpana in Cameo Appearance
Kozhikode Narayanan Nair
Vijayan Peringode

Soundtrack
The music was composed by Shyam and the lyrics were written by M. D. Rajendran and P. N. Vijayakumar.

References

External links
 

1997 films
1990s Malayalam-language films
Films directed by I. V. Sasi